The Hidden Face is a 2011 Spanish–Colombian thriller film directed by Andrés Baiz. It stars Quim Gutiérrez, Clara Lago and Martina García. The film was remade in Bollywood titled Murder 3 (2013), Turkey titled Öteki Taraf (2017) and in Mexico titled Perdida (2019).

Plot
Adrián (Quim Gutierrez), a young orchestra conductor is viewing a recorded video of his girlfriend Belén (Clara Lago) informing him of leaving him. Adrián becomes distraught. While drinking away his sorrows at a bar, he meets Fabiana (Martina Garcia) and they develop a relationship. Fabiana moves into the house that Adrián was sharing with Belén.  Strange things begin to occur in the bathroom, with Fabiana observing strange noises coming from the sink and bathtub, and being scalded by an abruptly hot shower.

Adrián becomes a suspect in the disappearance of Belén, however, the investigators can find no evidence of Adrián's involvement in Belén's disappearance. One of the police investigators, apparently a former boyfriend of Fabiana, warns Adrián that if anything happens to Fabiana he will kill Adrián.

It is revealed that the house is owned by a German lady, Emma, who showed Belén a secret room built to hide her husband just in case someone came to look for him, since he was a former Nazi SS officer. The room is self-contained and sealed off from sound. On Emma's suggestion, Belén, who had been jealous of Adrián's flirtatious relationship with one of his violinists, Verónica, had decided to pretend she was leaving him. She recorded the video saying she was leaving as she hid in the secret room. The room has some one way mirrors where she was able to observe Adrián's reaction. When she decides he has had enough she looks for the key and realizes she lost the key and is now trapped in the room with no way to contact Adrián.

Fabiana finds the key to the secret room, but she does not know what it is used for. Fabiana eventually figures out that Belén is trapped in the house because Belén is able to communicate through tapping on the pipes in the secret room, creating ripples in the full bathroom sink. As Fabiana is ready to open the door, she pauses and decides not to rescue Belén because she might lose Adrián.

Fabiana struggles with her decision, but decides to open the door and check on Belén because she cannot get a response from her. Also, one of the investigators gave Fabiana pictures of Adrián and Verónica and she herself feels the pangs of jealousy. As Fabiana is checking on Belén lying on a bed in the secret room, Belén surprises Fabiana, knocking her out and leaving Fabiana locked in the room. Belén decides to leave the house. She leaves the key to the secret room on a bed for Adrián to find and leaves a picture of the two of them taped to the mirror that acts as the door to the secret room. The final scene shows Belén sitting on the beach alone and Fabiana trapped inside, hoping to be rescued.

Cast 
 Quim Gutierrez - Adrián Salamanca
 Clara Lago - Belén Echeverria
 Martina García - Fabiana Caicedo
 Marcela Mar - Verónica
 Humberto Dorado - Roberto Peña (Tito)
 Julio Pachón - Francisco José Buitrago
 Juan Alfonso Baptista - Bernardo Ramírez
 Alexandra Stewart - Emma Engel

Reception
On the review aggregator website Rotten Tomatoes, the film holds an approval rating of 80% based on 5 reviews. Jonathan Holland from Variety wrote: "Andi Baiz's ambitious follow-up to the well-received Satanás does decent crowd-pleasing work, supplying the requisite jolts and nervous giggles en route to a payoff that's much stronger than its wobbly setup. But the pic ultimately fails to marshal its effects into anything more than throwaway entertainment." Chris Hewitt from St. Paul Pioneer Press gave a positive review, he wrote: "I'm not sure La Cara Oculta can stand up to much scrutiny — there's at least one gaping plot hole — but it's plenty of fun while its 93 minutes are zipping by." Jordi Batlle Caminal from Spanish newspaper La Vanguardia described the film as "(according to its own director) a tribute to Hitchcock's Rebecca, Suspicion and Notorious... The Hidden Face reveals itself as a suspense film well filmed and effective, willing to style and smoothly: tension is uniform and never decays."

See also 
 List of Spanish films of 2011

References

External links

2011 films
2011 thriller films
Colombian thriller films
Spanish thriller films
Films shot in Colombia
Films scored by Federico Jusid
Avalon films
2010s Spanish films
2010s Spanish-language films
2010s Colombian films